Narkamaŭka (or) is a colloquial name for the reformed Belarusian orthography. Evolved from the Belarusian narkam, abbreviated early Soviet name for the ministry, narodny kamisar. Narkamaŭka is the simplified version of the Belarusian language's orthography, with some scholars claiming that it turned out the language to become closer to Russian during Soviet era in Belarus.

The name was coined around the end of the 1980s or the beginning of the 1990s by the Belarusian linguist Vincuk Viačorka.

See also 
 Taraškievica
 Trasianka
 Russification of Belarus

References 

Belarusian grammar
Russification
Cultural assimilation